The Ming Tombs Reservoir or the Shisanling Reservoir (十三陵水库) is a dam in Changping District of northern Beijing. Named for the Ming tombs nearby, it is the lower reservoir of the Shisanling Pumped Storage Power Station. The dam creates a reservoir that can store  of water and contains a controlled chute spillway.

In 2008, the reservoir was one of the nine temporary venues of the Beijing Olympics. It was used for the Triathlon events at the 2008 Summer Olympics, during which it was known as the Triathlon Venue.

References

Beijing2008.cn Triathlon Venue profile

External links

Venues of the 2008 Summer Olympics
Olympic triathlon venues
Changping District
Defunct sports venues in China
Buildings and structures completed in 1958
Reservoirs in China